Alain de Boissieu Déan de Luigné (5 July 1915 – 5 April 2006) was a French general who served in the Free French Forces during World War II, later becoming Army chief of staff (1971–1975). He was the son-in-law of General Charles de Gaulle, leader of the Free French and postwar President of France.

Life
Son of a French noble family with title coming from Forez and Lyon (de Boissieu), Alain de Boissieu was a pupil at École Spéciale Militaire de Saint-Cyr (French military academy) in 1936 and Saumur (French cavalry school) in 1938. He was a cavalry officer during World War II and, with horses and sabre, made a successful charge (one of the last in cavalry history) against German troops on 11 June 1940.

A prisoner of the Germans, he managed to escape to the Soviet Union in March 1941. However Joseph Stalin was, at this time, an ally of Hitler. He was then sent for a while to a Soviet internment camp. Finally, after Germany invaded the Soviet Union in mid-1941, he joined General de Gaulle and the Free French Forces (FFL) in London.

As a Free French, Alain de Boissieu was involved in several military operations over Bayonne (Easter 1942) and Dieppe (Dieppe Raid, August 1942), in Madagascar and Djibouti with the FFL. He fought in the Battle of Normandy from 30 July 1944, as an officer of the famous 2nd Armored Division under General Philippe Leclerc de Hauteclocque, and was wounded on 12 August. He fought for the Liberation of Paris (25 August 1944).

In 1946, Alain de Boissieu married de Gaulle's daughter Élisabeth (1924–2013).

In 1956, he fought in the Algerian War. On 22 August 1962 he was in the same car as his father-in-law during the terrorist attack of Petit-Clamart planned by the Organisation armée secrète, when he saved the life of Charles de Gaulle.

As a general, he commanded the French military academy of Saint-Cyr, and of l'École militaire interarmes de Coëtquidan (1964).

He was Chief of Staff of the French Army (French: "chef d'État-major de l'Armée de Terre") from 1971 to 1975.

Alain de Boissieu became Grand Chancelier de l'ordre de la Légion d'Honneur and Chancelier de l'Ordre National du Mérite (1975–1981) and Chancelier de l'Ordre de la Libération (2002–2006). He resigned from the first two positions in 1981 in order not to be obligated to swear allegiance to, and present the Grand Necklace of the Légion d'Honneur to, newly elected French President François Mitterrand, who had called his father-in-law, Charles de Gaulle, a "dictator" in the 1960s.

Books by Alain de Boissieu 

"Pour Combattre avec de Gaulle (1940–1945)", Paris, 1981. 
"Pour servir le Général (1946–1970)", Paris, 1982.

Sources 
 Biography in L'Ordre de la Libération

External links  

1915 births
2006 deaths
People from Chartres
French Army personnel of World War II
French military personnel of the Algerian War
French generals
École Spéciale Militaire de Saint-Cyr alumni
École Spéciale Militaire de Saint-Cyr commandants
Companions of the Liberation
De Gaulle family
Grand Croix of the Légion d'honneur
Grand Chanceliers of the Légion d'honneur
French prisoners of war in World War II
World War II prisoners of war held by Germany
Free French military personnel of World War II
French escapees
Escapees from German detention